Sacagawea Glacier is east of the Continental Divide in the northern Wind River Range in the U.S. state of Wyoming. The glacier is located in the Fitzpatrick Wilderness of Shoshone National Forest, and is among the largest grouping of glaciers in the American Rocky Mountains. Sacagawea Glacier flows to the east, from a northeast facing cirque, starting near the summit of Mount Sacagawea. A large moraine and small  proglacial lake are situated beyond the terminal east end of the glacier.

See also
 List of glaciers in the United States

References

Glaciers of Fremont County, Wyoming
Shoshone National Forest
Glaciers of Wyoming
Sacagawea